Wenksville is an unincorporated community in Adams County, Pennsylvania, United States, at the foot of South Mountain and near the Old Slate Quarry serviced by the 1891 Hunter's Run and Slate Belt Railroad.  A United Methodist society was organized in the "Wanksville" community .

References

Unincorporated communities in Adams County, Pennsylvania
Unincorporated communities in Pennsylvania